Mike Hasenfratz (born June 19, 1966 in Regina, Saskatchewan) is a National Hockey League referee since the 2000–01 NHL season, he wore uniform number 30. However, since the beginning of the 2011–12 NHL season Hasenfratz now wears uniform number 2 (Formerly worn by Kerry Fraser),

References

1966 births
Living people
Ice hockey people from Saskatchewan
National Hockey League officials
Sportspeople from Regina, Saskatchewan